The Turco-Egyptian ranks were the military ranks used by the Kingdom of Egypt from 1922 until they were changed in 1958 after the Egyptian Revolution of 1952 and the abolition of the monarchy. The names are Turco-Egyptian (i.e. derived from Ottoman Turkish and Arabic), and are derived at least in part from the pre-existing military structure developed out of the reforms of Muhammad Ali Pasha. The design of the rank insignia was completely British with high ranks given only to British officers during Britain's occupation of Egypt. The rank of Sirdar was given to the British Commander-in-Chief of the Egyptian Army.

Ranks

Officers
The rank insignia for commissioned officers.

Enlisted
<noinclude>

See also
 Military ranks of Egypt

References

External links
 

Egypt under the Muhammad Ali dynasty
Military ranks of Egypt
Military history of Egypt